Roskill was a New Zealand parliamentary electorate, from 1919 to 1996. The electorate was represented by eight Members of Parliament.

Population centres
In the 1918 electoral redistribution, the North Island gained a further three electorates from the South Island due to faster population growth. Only two existing electorates were unaltered, five electorates were abolished, two former electorate were re-established, and three electorates, including Roskill, were created for the first time.

The electorate was in the western suburbs of Auckland, New Zealand.

History
The electorate was created in 1919, and existed continuously until 1996, the first mixed-member proportional representation (MMP) election, when it was included in the New Lynn electorate. The first representative was Vivian Potter, who represented the electorate for three terms for the Reform Party.

In the Roskill electorate, George Munns of the United Party won the 1928 election. In , Richards was challenged by the former representative Vivian Potter, but Potter came fourth out of the five candidates, with the incumbent winning the election.

In , the electorate was recreated as Mount Roskill, and was won by Phil Goff, who later became leader of the Labour Party.

Members of Parliament
The Roskill electorate was represented by eight Members of Parliament:

Key

Gilbert Myles' changes of allegiance, 1990–93

Election results

1993 election

1990 election

1987 election

1984 election

1981 election

1978 election

1975 election

1972 election

1969 election

1966 election

1963 election

1960 election

1957 election

1954 election

1951 election

1949 election

1946 election

1943 election

1938 election

1935 election

1931 election

1928 election

1919 election

Notes

References

Historical electorates of New Zealand
Politics of the Auckland Region
1919 establishments in New Zealand
1996 disestablishments in New Zealand